The Marinefliegerkommando (Naval Aviation Command) is the naval air arm of the German Navy.

History
After the war Germany was no longer allowed to maintain a military aviation capability. Heer and Marine both attempted to nevertheless maintain theoretical and practical knowledge of air warfare through concealed activities such as pilot training efforts. After the National Socialists had risen to power, these activities intensified until Nazi Germany unilaterally declared its withdrawal from armament limitations in 1935. The nascent rump naval air arm was quickly absorbed by Hermann Göring's newly established , much to the navies chagrin.

However, as a component of the air force, the Seeflieger maintained their organisational structure. A carrier-based aviation component was planned for the aircraft carrier Graf Zeppelin, laid down in 1936, but lack of suitable aircraft, coupled with the reluctance of the Luftwaffe to support the Kriegsmarine in the carrier's construction, culminated in its eventual cancellation in 1943.

After the Second World War, it was not until West Germany's entry into NATO in the 1950s and the establishment of the Bundesmarine, that a naval aviation force (Marineflieger) was formed.

The United Kingdom was instrumental for the creation of the Marineflieger, supplying training and aircraft. A number of Royal Navy Fleet Air Arm (FAA) officers operated as part of the German Navy in the process. The first aircraft included Hawker Sea Hawks, which were used by Marinefliegergeschwader 1 and 2, and Fairey Gannets. Until the new bases were ready, pilots were trained with the FAA in the UK.

The first Kommando der Marineflieger was created in July 1956 in Kiel-Holtenau and elevated to divisional level in 1964, renamed to Marinefliegerkommando in 1967 and to Marinefliegerdivision in 1969 as it grew in size. This Naval Aviation Division commanded five wings and several supporting units in total before 1990, including two combat aircraft wings equipped with Lockheed Starfighter fighter aircraft and then the Panavia Tornado. The Fairey Gannet maritime patrol aircraft (MPA) was replaced with the Bréguet Atlantic.

After the Cold War, the unit was renamed to Flotille der Marineflieger in 1994 and reduced to a brigade-level command. Its last combat aircraft were handed over to the German Air Force in 2005 before the flotilla was dissolved on 30 June 2006. Afterwards, the remaining wings were directly assigned to fleet command until 8 October 2012, when the current Marinefliegerkommando was created in Nordholz under Kapitän zur See Andreas Horstmann, who had already been charged with naval aviation at fleet command in Rostock from 2006 to 2009. At the same time the remaining naval aviation aircraft were largely consolidated at Nordholz Naval Airbase.

Subordinate units 
Apart from the staff, two - the 3rd and 5th - wings are currently assigned to the unit.

Naval Air Wing 3 (MFG 3) "Graf Zeppelin" 

The German Navy's fixed-wing aircraft, namely eight Lockheed P-3C Orion MPA taken over from the Dutch Navy and two modified Dornier 228LM pollution control aircraft are assigned to the 3rd wing, Marinefliegergeschwader 3 "Graf Zeppelin". The unit is also responsible for handling flight operations in Nordholz. It was established in 1964.

The wings tasks include surveillance and control of large sea areas as well as maritime warfare against targets above (ASuW) and below water (ASW). Pollution control patrols are carried out implementing the MARPOL 73/78 convention on behalf of and in cooperation with German civilian authorities, namely the German coastal states and agencies under the Federal Ministry of Transport, who do not maintain the appropriate aircraft themselves.

The P-3Cs are to be replaced with five P-8 Poseidon MPAs from 2024 on in order to avoid a looming capability gap caused by bringing forward the out-of-service date of the P-3Cs to 2025. A prior attempt to extensively refurbish the aircraft and extend their service time to 2035 was abandoned due to cost and technical issues.

A technical support group (Gruppe) and a flying group, each with two flights (Staffeln) make up the unit along with an airbase group which is responsible for logistics, command infrastructure and air traffic:

 Staff
 Flying Group
 1st Flight (P-3C)
 2nd Flight (P-3C, Do-228LM)
 Technical Group
 Technical Flight (P-3C)
 Technical Flight (general purpose)
 Air Base Group

Naval Air Wing 5 (MFG 5)T 
Marinefliegergeschwader 5 commands the navies rotorcraft fleet of Westland Sea Lynx MK 88 A and Sea King Mk 41 helicopters, tasked with ship-based anti-submarine warfare, anti-surface warfare, transport and special forces support duties and is responsible for search and rescue (SAR) duty in the North and Baltic seas. The Sea King fleet is currently transitioning to the NH90 Sea Lion. Sea Lion operations began during June 2020 and the wing will eventually have 20 in service. The NH90 in its Sea Tiger version will also replace the Sea Lynx from 2025 on as the navies frigate-based helicopter.

The unit redeployed in 2012-2013 to Nordholz from Kiel-Holtenau where it had been stationed since its creation in 1958.

 Staff
 Flying Group
 1st Flight (Sea Lynx Mk 88 A)
 2nd Flight (Sea King Mk 41)
 ? Flight (Sea Lion)
 Instruction Flight
 Technical Group
 Technical Flight (Sea Lynx Mk 88 A)
 Technical Flight (Sea King Mk 41)
 Technical Flight (Sea Lion)
 Technical Instruction Flight

Aircraft
The command had 2,500 personnel on active duty in 2020. As of 2019, it operates 54 aircraft.

|-
|Sea Falcon
|Sweden
|UAV
|ISR
| 2022
|
|
|2 on order as a testbed for future UAVs on the corvettes, 8 more planned
|-
|Puma AE II
|United States
|UAV
|ISR
|2019 
|6
|
|3 systems with 6 UAVs, dubbed "LARUS" in the German Navy 
|-
|DJI Phantom 4
|China
|Micro UAV
|ISR
|2017 
|5
|
|
|-
| Dornier 228LM
| Germany
| Propeller
| Pollution control
| 1991
| 2
| 2
| 
|- 
| Boeing P-8 Poseidon
| United States
| Jet
| MPA
| 2025
| 
| 
| 5 on order, replacing Lockheed P-3 Orion from 2025 onwards
|- 
| Lockheed P-3 Orion
| United States
| Propeller
| MPA
| 2006
| 5
| 8
| Formerly of the Royal Netherlands Navy. To be replaced with five Boeing Boeing P-8 Poseidon. 
|-
| NHI NH90 Sea Lion
| Europe
| Rotorcraft
| SAR/transport
| 2018
| 14
| 14
| 4 more on order, replacing the Sea King
|-
| NHI NH90 Sea Tiger
| Europe
| Rotorcraft
| ASW
| 2025
| 
|
| 31 on order, replacing the Westland Lynx
|-
| Westland Sea Lynx Mk 88 A
| United Kingdom
| Rotorcraft
| Attack/SAR/transport
| 1981
| 21
| 21
|  
|- 
| Westland Sea King Mk 41
| United Kingdom
| Rotorcraft
| SAR/transport
| 1972
| 19
| 22
| 
|}

The Marineflieger previously operated the following aircraft:
 Panavia Tornado
 F-104 G Starfighter
 Hawker Sea Hawk
 Fairey Gannet
 Breguet Atlantic
 Dornier Do 28

Gallery

See also
Luftschiffer

References

External links
https://web.archive.org/web/20080321114500/http://www.fly-navy.de/index2.html

 
Military units and formations of the Imperial German Navy
Military units and formations of the German Navy
Military aviation units and formations of Germany in World War I